Mount Sinai ( Har Sīnay; Aramaic: ܛܘܪܐ ܕܣܝܢܝ Ṭūrāʾ Dsyny), also known as Jabal Musa (translation: Mountain of Moses), is a mountain on the Sinai Peninsula of Egypt. It is possibly the location of the biblical Mount Sinai, the place where, according to the Torah, Bible, and Quran, Moses received the Ten Commandments.

It is surrounded on all sides by higher peaks in the mountain range of which it is a part.

Geology

Mount Sinai's rocks were formed during the late stage of the evolution of the Arabian-Nubian Shield. Mount Sinai displays a ring complex that consists of alkaline granites intruded into diverse rock types, including volcanics. The granites range in composition from syenogranite to alkali feldspar granite. The volcanic rocks are alkaline to peralkaline, and they are represented by subaerial flows and eruptions and subvolcanic porphyry. Generally, the nature of the exposed rocks in Mount Sinai indicates that they were formed at different depths from one another.

Religious significance

Judaism and Christianity 

Immediately north of the mountain is the 6th-century Saint Catherine's Monastery. The summit has a mosque that is still used by Muslims, and a Greek Orthodox chapel, constructed in 1934 on the ruins of a 16th-century church, that is not open to the public. The chapel encloses the rock which is considered to be the source for the biblical Tablets of Stone. At the summit also is "Moses' cave", where Moses was said to have waited to receive the Ten Commandments.

Islam 
The Jabal Musa is associated with the Islamic prophet Musa (Moses). In particular, numerous references to Jabal Musa exist in the Quran, where it is called Ṭūr Saināʾ, Ṭūr Sīnīn, and aṭ-Ṭūr and al-Jabal (both meaning "the Mount"). As for the adjacent Wād Ṭuwā (Valley of Tuwa), it is considered as being muqaddas (sacred), and a part of it is called Al-Buqʿah Al-Mubārakah ("The Blessed Place"). It is the place where Musa spoke to his Lord.

Ascent and summit
There are two principal routes to the summit. The longer and shallower route, Siket El Bashait, takes about 2.5 hours on foot, though camels can be used. The steeper, more direct route (Siket Sayidna Musa) is up the 3,750 "steps of penitence" in the ravine behind the monastery.

See also
 Hashem El Tarif
 Sacred mountains
 Jebel Musa, Morocco, a similarly named mountain in Morocco

References

External links

 
 Caucasian Albanian Alphabet Discovered and Deciphered, Azerbaijan International, Vol. 11:3 (Autumn 2003). Six articles.
 View OF Mount Sinai (as opposed to the view FROM Mount Sinai)
 Information about the town of St. Katherine and the Sinai mountains
 A Report on Mount Sinai
 Old maps of Mount Sinai. Eran Laor Cartographic Collection, The National Library of Israel.

 
Mountains of Egypt
Sinai Peninsula
Sacred mountains
Hebrew Bible mountains
Tourist attractions in Egypt
Midian
Moses
Sinai
Christian pilgrimage sites